Celeste O. Norfleet (born February 11, 1959, in Philadelphia, Pennsylvania) is a contemporary African-American novelist known for romance and young adult novels.

Early years
Norfleet was born and raised in Philadelphia, Pennsylvania. After attending public school, she received her B.F.A. degree in fashion illustration from Moore College of Art and Design. She spent the next years working in the advertising field, first as a graphic artist, and later as a creative art director.

Writing
In 1991, Norfleet moved to Northern Virginia. A few years later, she began reading romance novels. After reading many novels in this genre, she wrote one herself in 1999. Priceless Gift, her first romance novel, was sold to BET Books in 2001, and published in March 2002. Priceless Gift began the Mamma Lou Matchmaker continuing series. Norfleet has since written more than twenty novels.

In 2007, Harlequin Kimani TRU released Norfleet’s first young adult novel, Pushing Pause, which received positive reviews. This novel became the first in a series known as The Kenisha Lewis Series, written for teens and adults, which was followed by the books Fast Forward and Gettin’ Played.

Norfleet now writes romance novels full-time. She describes her stories as realistic with some humor, depicting strong, sexy characters involved in unpredictable adventures. She also writes dramatic fiction for young adults, reflecting current issues facing African-American teens.

Acclaim
Norfleet's books have been well received, including nominations for The Rose Award, Romantic Times Book club Reviewer’s Choice Award and RSJ Author of the Year.  Celeste currently writes for Harlequin’s Kimani Press Arabesque, Harlequin Kimani Romance and Kimani Press TRU (young adult) lines.

Personal
Norfleet currently lives in Virginia with her husband and two teenagers.

Bibliography

Romance
 Priceless Gift, 2002
 A Christmas Wish, 2002
 Since Forever, 2003
 One Sure Thing, 2003, (featuring winner of the 2002 Arabesque Man cover contest)
 Reflections of You, 2004
 Irresistible You, 2004
 Only You, 2005
 The Fine Art of Love, 2005
 A Taste of Romance in Back In Your Arms (with Sandra Kitt and Deidre Savoy), 2006
 Love After All, 2007
 Following Love, 2008
 When Love Calls, 2008
 Sultry Storm, in Mother Nature Matchmaker (with Brenda Jackson and  Carmen Green) 2009
 When It Feels So Right, 2009
 Love Me Now, 2009
 Cross My Heart, 2010
 Heart’s Choice, in Millionaire Matchmaker (with Donna Hill and Adrianne Byrd) 2010
 Flirting With Destiny, (Kimani Hottie Series) 2010

Young Adult Novels
 Pushing Pause, 2007
 She Said, She Said, 2008 (with Jennifer Norfleet)
 Fast Forward, 2009
 Getting Played 2010
 Download Drama 2012

Recognition 
 Nominated - Rose Award, Since Forever  2003
 Nominated – Romantic Times Book – Reviewer’s Choice Award  – Best African American Romance (2004)
 Nominated – Romantic Times Book – Career Achievement Award (2009)
 Nominated  - Romance Slam Jam – Best Steamy Romance (2009)
 Nominated – Romantic Times Book  - Author of The Year (2009)
 Finalist  - YALSA - Quick Picks for Reluctant Readers List (2009)

References

External links

 https://web.archive.org/web/20111002001559/http://www.urban-reviews.com/insideout-celesteonorfleet.html
 https://web.archive.org/web/20100201224343/http://eharlequin.com/author.html?authorid=438
 

1959 births
Living people
20th-century American novelists
21st-century American novelists
African-American novelists
American romantic fiction writers
American women novelists
Moore College of Art and Design alumni
Writers from Philadelphia
American writers of young adult literature
Women romantic fiction writers
20th-century American women writers
21st-century American women writers
Women writers of young adult literature
Novelists from Pennsylvania
20th-century African-American women writers
20th-century African-American writers
21st-century African-American women writers
21st-century African-American writers